Grand Arcade may refer to one of several shopping centres:

 Grand Arcade (Barnet)
 Grand Arcade (Cambridge)
 Grand Arcade (Leeds)
 Grand Arcade (Wigan)